Medicinal Chemistry Research is a peer-reviewed scientific journal  of medicinal chemistry emphasizing the structure-activity relationships of biologically active compounds. It was founded in 1991 by Alfred Burger (University of Virginia), who also founded the Journal of Medicinal Chemistry. The journal is currently edited by Longqin Hu.

Editors in chief
Alfred Burger served as its first editor-in-chief before passing on the mantle to Richard Glennon (Virginia Commonwealth University). Stephen J. Cutler (University of South Carolina) then took over and served between 2002 and 2019. Longqin Hu (Rutgers University–New Brunswick) became editor in 2020.

Abstracting and indexing 
The journal is abstracted and indexed in the following bibliographic databases:

References

External links 

 

Medicinal chemistry journals
Publications established in 1991
Monthly journals
English-language journals
Springer Science+Business Media academic journals